Michael Laurence Karmazin (July 16, 1919 – January 21, 2004) was a professional American football guard. Prior to playing at the professional level, Karmazin played college football at Duke University. He earned All-America and All-Southern Conference honors in 1941. During the 1942 Rose Bowl, he tackled Don Durdan for a safety, in a 20–16 loss to Oregon State. He was later drafted in 1946 by the Boston Yanks of the National Football League (NFL), however he ended playing in the rival All-America Football Conference (AAFC) for the New York Yankees in 1946. He played professionally again in 1947, for the Paterson Panthers of the American Association.

References

1919 births
2004 deaths
American football guards
Duke Blue Devils football players
Manhattan Beach Coast Guard Depth Bombers football players
New York Yankees (AAFC) players
People from Washington County, Pennsylvania
Players of American football from Pennsylvania